Tallman is a surname that means "Servant of Christ". Notable people with the surname include:

 Bob Tallman (born 1947), American rodeo announcer
 Charles Tallman (1900–1973), American football coach
 Chris Tallman (born 1970), American actor
 Frank Tallman (1919–1978), American stunt pilot
 Kenneth L. Tallman (1925–2006), United States Air Force general
 Patricia Tallman (born 1957), American actress
 Peleg Tallman (1764–1840), American politician
 Richard C. Tallman (born 1953), American judge
 Richard J. Tallman (1925–1972), U.S. Army general
 Warren Tallman (1921–1994), American Canadian literary critic
 Will Tallman (21st century), American politician

https://www.geni.com/people/Mikky-Tallman/5174506211350047610